Mansfield F.C. was an English football club based in Mansfield, Nottinghamshire.

History
The club was formed as Mansfield Town in 1885 and joined the Midland League in 1892. In 1894 they absorbed Greenhalgh's FC and dropped Town from their name. They spent four years in the league before resigning because of financial difficulties. They folded soon after.

References

Defunct football clubs in Nottinghamshire
Association football clubs established in 1885
Association football clubs disestablished in 1896
Midland Football League (1889)
Sport in Mansfield